Gemmula hombroni is a species of sea snail, a marine gastropod mollusk in the family Turridae, the turrids.

Description
The length of the shell varies between 16 mm and 25 mm.

Distribution
This marine species occurs in the Indo-west Pacific, from Andaman Islands to Japan; also off Australia (Northern Territory, Queensland, Western Australia)

References

 Hombron, J.B. & Jacquinot, C.H. (eds) 1853. Voyage au Pole Sud et dans l'Océanie sur les corvettes l'Astrolabe et la Zélée exécuté par ordre du Roi pendant les années 1837-1840, sous le commandement de M.J. Dumont-d'Urville Capitaine de Vaisseau. Zoologie. Paris : Gide & Baudry Vol. 3 166 pp. 
 Schepman, M.M. 1913. Toxoglossa. pp. 384–396 in Weber, M. & de Beaufort, L.F. (eds). The Prosobranchia, Pulmonata and Opisthobranchia Tectibranchiata, Tribe Bullomorpha, of the Siboga Expedition. Monograph 49. Siboga Expeditie 32(2) 
 Thiele J. (1925). Gastropoden der Deutschen Tiefsee-Expedition. II Teil. Wissenschaftliche Ergebnisse der Deutschen Tiefsee-Expedition auf dem Dampfer "Valdivia" 1898-1899. 17(2): 35-382, pls 13-46
 Powell, A.W.B. 1964. The Family Turridae in the Indo-Pacific. Part 1. The Subfamily Turrinae. Indo-Pacific Mollusca 1: 227-346
 Powell, A.W.B. 1966. The molluscan families Speightiidae and Turridae, an evaluation of the valid taxa, both Recent and fossil, with list of characteristic species. Bulletin of the Auckland Institute and Museum. Auckland, New Zealand 5: 1–184, pls 1–23 
 Powell, A.W.B. 1967. The family Turridae in the Indo-Pacific. Part 1a. The Turrinae concluded. Indo-Pacific Mollusca 1(7): 409-443, pls 298-317
 Shuto, T. 1969. Neogene gastropods from Panay Island, the Philippines. Memoires of the Faculty of Science, Kyushu University 19(1): 1-250

External links
  Tucker, J.K. 2004 Catalog of recent and fossil turrids (Mollusca: Gastropoda). Zootaxa 682:1-1295.

hombroni
Gastropods described in 1922